Richard D. Veltri (November 12, 1936 – January 4, 2015) was an American educator and politician.

Born in Huntington, New York, Veltri received his bachelor's and master's degree from Rensselaer Polytechnic Institute and his doctorate degree in mechanical engineering from University of Connecticut. He then worked for United Technologies Research Center. He served on the East Hartford, Connecticut Town Board and was a Republican. Veltri served in the Connecticut House of Representatives from 1994 to 1998.

Notes

1935 births
2015 deaths
People from East Hartford, Connecticut
People from Huntington, New York
Rensselaer Polytechnic Institute alumni
University of Connecticut alumni
American mechanical engineers
Republican Party members of the Connecticut House of Representatives
Engineers from New York (state)